This is a list of notable schools in the African country of Guinea.

Primary and secondary schools
 American International School of Conakry – in Conakry; 
 Lycée français Albert Camus – in Conakry; French school;
The English Speaking Community School of Guinea - In Conakry; Bilingual School
Ecole Maternelle and Primaire Bilingue Hope Horizons

Christ the redeemer’s Academy “Beginners,Primay and Secondary” School.

Tertiary education

See also

 Education in Guinea
 Lists of schools

Schools
Schools
Schools
Guinea
Guinea